The Haripath is a collection of twenty-eight abhangas (poems) revealed to the thirteenth-century Marathi Saint, Dnyaneshwar. It is recited by Varkaris each day.

The Haripath consists of a series of 28 ecstatic musical poems or Abhangs which repeatedly praise the value of chanting of God’s names, describe the countless benefits to be gained, and gives us many insights into the correct way to live a spiritual life, a life immersed in the blissful presence of this divinity whom Jñaneshwar calls Hari, Vitthal, Panduranga, and our own Self.

Songs list - Sampoorna Haripath Shree Sant Dnyaneshwar Maharaj

Bibliography
 L'Invocation: Le Haripath de Dnyandev, by Charlotte Vaudeville (Paris: Ecole Francaise D'Extreme-Orient, 1969)

References

Hindu texts
Bhakti movement
Warkari